The 1975–76 Illinois State Redbirds men's basketball team represented Illinois State University during the 1975–76 NCAA Division I men's basketball season. The Redbirds, led by first-year head coach Gene Smithson, played their home games at Horton Field House in Normal, Illinois and competed as an independent (not a member of a conference). They finished the season 20–7.

Roster

Schedule

|-
!colspan=9 style=|Regular season

Source

References

Illinois State Redbirds men's basketball seasons
Illinois State
Illinois State Redbirds men's basketball
Illinois State Redbirds men's basketball